The 1999 Adamawa State gubernatorial election occurred in Nigeria on January 9, 1999. The PDP nominee Boni Haruna won the election, defeating the APP's Bala Takaya.

Atiku Abubakar was the PDP candidate after the primary election and defacto winner of the 1999 Adamawa gubernatorial election, but got nominated by PDP presidential candidate, Olusegun Obasanjo, as Vice President. His running mate, Boni Haruna, thereafter assumed his place as Governor-elect. Haruna thereafter picked Bello Tukur as running mate. Among other PDP primary election contestants was Abubakar Girei who got just two votes.

Electoral system
The Governor of Adamawa State is elected using the plurality voting system.

Results
PDP's Boni Haruna emerged winner in the contest.

The total number of registered voters in the state for the election was 1,260,956. However, 1,261,900 were previously issued voting cards in the state.

References 

Adamawa State gubernatorial elections
Adamawa State gubernatorial election
Adamawa State gubernatorial election